Winifred Mary Page (1887–1965) was a British botanist, taxonomist, and mycologist known for her research on mushrooms published in the Transactions of the British Mycological Society.  In 1951 she was elected to the Linnean Society of London.

References 

1887 births
1965 deaths
British women scientists
British botanists
British mycologists

Fellows of the Linnean Society of London